"Dreams" is an episode from the television series M*A*S*H. It was the 22nd episode of the eighth season, broadcast and aired on February 18, 1980 and repeated September 1, 1980. It was directed by Alan Alda. "Dreams" was conceived by James Jay Rubinfier and co-written with Alan Alda. The episode received two prestigious writing honors:  The Humanitas Prize (1980), and a Writers' Guild of America nomination for episodic television writing in the dramatic category, which was a first as M*A*S*H received WGA nominations in both comedy and drama categories that same year. The laugh track is omitted for this episode.

Alda credits "Dreams" as one of his favorite M*A*S*H episodes.

Overview 
In this surreal episode, the group performs surgery on 211 patients in 33 hours without sleep. The main characters attempt to get whatever rest they can between surgeries, but their dreams offer no relief from the war. Once the marathon of wounded ends, they consider getting some long-deserved sleep. However, Winchester's glib response of "...to sleep, perchance to dream..." (from Hamlet, Act 3, Scene 1) causes them to reconsider sleep in favor of coffee to stay awake.

In a parallel story, a young lieutenant in charge of the motor pool refuses to send ambulances to the camp to evacuate patients, fearing that he will be billed for any damage to the vehicles. The dichotomy between the lieutenant's low stress environment - and eating a sandwich during a phone conversation with Colonel Potter - stands in stark contrast to the suffering and lack of personal attention doctors and nurses at the MASH unit experience.  The staff are forced to build bunks in the post-op ward in order to accommodate the wounded; when these fill up, they start moving patients into every available space, including Klinger's office, forcing him to sleep in the supply room. When a general recovering in post-op demands to know why the hospital is so crowded, Potter informs him of the lieutenant's reluctance. The general calls the young officer and intimidates him into sending the ambulances so the patients can be evacuated.

Dreams 
 Napping in her tent, Margaret Houlihan sees the door open and sunlight spill in. Finding herself in a wedding gown, she steps out into a meadow and encounters a handsome civilian man in a tuxedo. The two begin to kiss on an ornate bed, but he soon leaves her to join a line of soldiers marching past. Houlihan is dismayed at his departure, then horrified to find several wounded soldiers lying in the bed, and finally stands alone in the meadow with blood covering her hands and gown.
 B.J. Hunnicutt falls asleep in the post-op ward, holding a photo of his wife Peg. He dreams that the area has become a ballroom, where - now in a white tuxedo - he waltzes Peg (portrayed by Catherine Bergstrom) into the operating room to the tune of the second waltz of Tausend und eine Nacht Op. 346 by Johann Strauss II. Potter interrupts to hand him a scalpel, and Hunnicutt begins to operate as a heartbroken Peg follows two other men back to the ballroom. 
 Sherman T. Potter dozes off at his desk and dreams that his horse Sophie has entered the office. Now dressed in his World War I cavalry uniform, he mounts her and rides into a field, where two North Korean soldiers throw a grenade at him. He knocks it away with a polo mallet, causing it to explode into a fireworks display, and comes upon his childhood home. Here, a young Sherman rides a horse outside as a female voice calls him to dinner just before Klinger wakes Potter up.
 Charles Winchester dozes off in a tent near a group of patients. When the flaps rise, he finds himself dressed as a magician and performs a series of tricks for the operating room staff. His attention is soon drawn by a gasping patient in the front row, but he can offer no help; he continues his routine in a panic as the crowd looks on him as a fool and the man slowly dies on the table.
 While hearing a confession, Father Mulcahy falls asleep and dreams that he is the Pope, being carried through the mess hall in the Holy Father's ceremonial chair. The staff offer their praise and adoration as he takes the pulpit in awe and opens his Bible. Before he can speak, though, blood begins to drip onto the pages. He glances up to find that the life-sized crucifix just behind and next to the pulpit has been replaced by a wounded soldier, then finds that the staff have begun operating on patients, paying him no mind.
 Maxwell Klinger sneaks off to the supply room for a nap and dreams that the room is shaking as a train conductor's voice announces an arrival in his hometown of Toledo. He exits the room and emerges into the city streets, finding them deserted, but stops to look in through the front window of Tony Packo's Cafe. The doctors are inside and operating on a patient; when Potter beckons him closer, the patient turns his head and is revealed to be Klinger himself. Nurse Kellye wakes Klinger with a message from Potter. 
 Hawkeye Pierce falls asleep in the mess hall and dreams that he is back in medical school, being asked a question for which he does not know the answer - how to reattach a limb. The professor instructs Pierce to remove each of his arms, with Winchester aiding on the second, and throws both of them away. Pierce finds himself floating in a rowboat on a lake filled with detached mannequin arms and legs and sees a wounded Korean girl at the water's edge, then appears onshore and walks up to find her on an operating table. Unable to take the scalpel being offered to him, he screams in frustration at the sound of an approaching helicopter. He wakes up to the sound of real incoming choppers.

Other notes 
 Catherine Bergstrom would again play Peg Hunnicutt in the episode "Oh, How We Danced."

References

External links 
 Summary on TV.com
 Alan Alda's favorite M*A*S*H episodes

M*A*S*H (season 8) episodes
1980 American television episodes
Television episodes about dreams
Television episodes directed by Alan Alda